Ahmad Akbar Khan (born 12 October 1984) is an Australian born Pakistani footballer, who last played for Pakistan Air Force. He won 2014 edition of National Football Challenge Cup with the club.

Khan plays as a forward and first represented Pakistan against Palestine in March 2011 in two unofficial matches. He went on to pick up his first cap during the 2014 FIFA World Cup qualifications against Bangladesh in Dhaka, coming on as an 83rd-minute substitute for Syed Arif Hussian . Khan's preferred position is on the wing as he has great vision and dribbling ability. Playing his football as a youth with a large number of South Americans, he has the skills of a Brazilian and short passing game of the South American teams.

Honours
Pakistan Air Force
 National Football Challenge Cup: 2014

External links
Promising at left wing

References

Pakistani footballers
Pakistan international footballers
Living people
1983 births
Association football forwards
Australian sportspeople of Pakistani descent